Joseph Conant Avery (June 9, 1817 – June 16, 1876) was the founder of Corvallis, Oregon. Avery was the first postmaster for the community, and served as a legislator in the Provisional Government of Oregon and the government of the Oregon Territory. Avery House (formerly Avery Lodge) at Oregon State University was named after him.

Early life
Avery was born in Tunkhannock, Pennsylvania on June 9, 1817. He was educated in Wilkes-Barre before moving to Illinois in 1839. Avery then married Martha Marsh in 1841 before they immigrated to Oregon Country in 1845.

Oregon
After wintering at Oregon City, the family moved south the next year. Joseph Avery settled at the mouth of Marys River where it flows into the Willamette River in the central part of the Willamette Valley of what would become the state of Oregon. At that location he operated a ferry across the Willamette and established a farm. In 1848, Avery went to the gold fields of California and mined for a brief time before using his gold to purchase mercantile goods. Avery then returned to Oregon where he opened a store on his land claim where he then established a town site. He surveyed and platted the area and named it Marysville in 1850.

In 1848, Avery was elected and served in the final session of the Provisional Legislature of Oregon that began in December. He was elected to the Oregon Territorial Legislature in 1850 through 1852, serving as a Whig and representing Benton County. In 1853, Avery was appointed as a postal agent servicing both Washington and Oregon territories. In 1856, Avery returned to the Territorial Legislature as a Democrat. Joseph Avery, the father of 12 children, died on June 16, 1876. He was buried at the Masonic Cemetery in Corvallis.

Naming controversy
After the demise of the Expositor newspaper at Eola in Polk County, Avery acquired the Expositor'''s equipment and provided Corvallis with its first printing press. He was later accused of using this press to operate the pro-slavery Occidental Messenger''. Although surviving copies of the Occidental Messenger do not identify Avery as the paper's owner and do not indicate that he had control of the paper's editorial content, several contemporary sources identify Avery as the central force behind the Occidental Messenger's publication. This connection to the pro-slavery movement led to an inquiry in 2017 by Oregon State University (OSU) about whether to retain the Avery name on a residence hall. OSU decided to re-name the building.

See also
 Bushrod Washington Wilson

References

Members of the Provisional Government of Oregon
Members of the Oregon Territorial Legislature
19th-century American politicians
1817 births
1876 deaths
People from Tunkhannock, Pennsylvania
Oregon pioneers
Oregon postmasters
Oregon Whigs
Oregon Democrats
Politicians from Corvallis, Oregon